Maher Berakdar (born 26 March 1968) is a Syrian football goalkeeper who played for Syria in the 1996 Asian Cup.

External links

Maher Berakdar at 11v11.com

Syrian footballers
Living people
1968 births
Al-Karamah players
Nejmeh SC players
Association football goalkeepers
Sportspeople from Homs
Syrian expatriate footballers
Expatriate footballers in Lebanon
Syrian expatriate sportspeople in Lebanon
Syrian Premier League players
Lebanese Premier League players